The 'W' Files (衛斯理) is a 2003 Hong Kong science fantasy-action-adventure-mystery television period drama serial based on Ni Kuang's novel series Wisely Series, starring Gallen Lo as Wisely. The series was first broadcast on TVB in Hong Kong from 2 June to 11 July 2003. The 30-episodes long series contains a total of eight different stories, set in China in the 1930s.

Plot
In the 1930s, Wisely returns to China from his overseas studies and runs a detective agency in Shanghai to investigate paranormal events. He meets a doctor named Pak So and she becomes his love interest, but they encounter several trials and tribulations to test their love before they finally get together. The series is divided into eight different stories, with Wisely and his team setting off to investigate and crack each mystery case. The stories are listed as follows:
Paper Monkey (紙猴)
Deadly Body Change (屍變)
Charcoal (木炭)
Searching Dreams (尋夢)
Bug Suspect (蠱惑)
Supernatural Beings (神仙)
Ghost Story (鬼混)
Disturbing Graves (盜墓)

Cast

Detective agency

Pak family

Green Gang

Wan family

Police

Others

Characters in Paper Monkey

Characters in Deadly Body Change

Characters in Charcoal

Characters in Searching Dreams

Characters in Bug Suspect

Characters in Supernatural Beings

Characters in Ghost Story

Characters in Disturbing Graves

Popular Culture Trivia
It Had to Be You (released in 1924) is a popular, romantic song that was written by Gus Kahn and composed by Isham Jones. Joe Junior performed the song throughout the series.
Ruan Lingyu was a popular silent film actress in Shanghai from 1927 to 1935. Her fame and tragic suicide were occasionally mentioned throughout the series whenever the characters read articles about Ruan Lingyu from the newspaper. After their movie date, Choi May-sin discussed briefly with Wisely about Ruan's character in her notable film The Goddess (1934 film).
 When Will You Return? - 何日君再來 is a classic song that was released in 1937, Shanghai and was first performed by Zhou Xuan in the same year. Lau Lai-ling performed a segment of this song in the Searching Dreams story.
Loch Ness has garnered national attention in 1933 due to the public's interest in the Loch Ness Monster. At the end of the series, Wisely and Pak So ended up together on a small boat in a lake. Pak So asked Wisely, "This lake is so big. Can you guess what lake is this?" Wisely responded, "I don't care what lake this is, as long as there's no strange things/events that will occur to interrupt our alone time together." The camera zoomed out and showed the sign Loch Ness and then zoomed out even further showing a giant creature swimming and howling underwater.

See also
 Wisely Series, the novel series by Ni Kuang
 Films and television series adapted from the Wisely Series:
 The Seventh Curse, a 1986 Hong Kong film starring Chow Yun-fat as Wisely
 The Legend of Wisely, a 1987 Hong Kong film starring Sam Hui as Wisely
 The Cat (1992 film), a 1998 Hong Kong film starring Waise Lee as Wisely
 The New Adventures of Wisely, a 1998 Singaporean television series starring Michael Tao as Wisely
 The Wesley's Mysterious File, a 2002 Hong Kong film starring Andy Lau as Wisely

External links
 Official TVB site

TVB dramas
2003 Hong Kong television series debuts
2003 Hong Kong television series endings
Hong Kong action television series
Martial arts television series
Science fantasy television series
Adventure television series
Mystery television series
Detective television series
Serial drama television series
Television shows based on Chinese novels
Television shows set in Shanghai
2000s Hong Kong television series